Jelena (Serbian Cyrillic: Јелена) is the first Serbian telenovela ever shot. Series is shot for BK TV by PowerHouse Entertainment owned by Saša D. Karić.

Plot

Belgrade in the 70's. Jelena, the daughter of a high ranked politician and Vuk, a poor young man decided to run away for her 18th birthday, but someone set them up. Jelena has been drugged and locked in her room and her father had been killed. The blame fell on Vuk and he ran from Yugoslavia. Thirteen years later he returns to Belgrade to clear his name.

Episodes

Cast

Season 1

At the beginning of season 1 we meet the characters. Main characters in season 1 are Jelena, Vuk, Ratko, Mira, Petar, Helen, Saša, Tatjana, Sofija, Sandra & Momir. Character Momir's cousin Gvozden is introduced in episode 3, character of Boban, young man who works for Ratko and Jelena and lives with them is introduced in episode 1 and character of inspector Miša Andrić is introduced in episode 9.

Season 2

At the beginning of season 2 character of Momir's cousin Gvozden became regular cast member. In episode 11 is introduced character of Vuk's son Majkl.

Season 3

At the beginning of season 3 character of Vuk's son Majkl became regular from this season. In episode 15 is introduced character of Bane Jelena's boss. Ivan Bekjarev departed the cast at the end of the season.

Season 4

In episode 19 is introduced character of Nemanja, Saša's friend and news photographer. Ružica Sokić and Srna Lango departed the cast at the end of the season.

Season 5

At the beginning of the season characters of Boban, inspector Miša Andrić, Bane and Nemanja had become regulars and Mirjana Bajović and Sofija Jovanović became recurring characters. This is also the final season of the show.

Crew
Writer: Joaquín Guerrero Casasola
Series editor and script adaptation: Katarina Aleksić
Series manager: Vladan Cvetković
Executive producer: Hernan Moris (Seasons 2–5)
Costume designer: Jasmina Sanader (Seasons 1–3), Irena Belojica (Seasons 4–5)
Production designer: Ivana Protić
Editor: Stevan Marić
Director of photography: Draško Plavšić
Director: Andrej Aćin (Seasons 1–4), Danilo Paškvan (Season 5)

References

 
RTV BK Telecom original programming